Ursell is a surname. Notable people with the surname include:

 Fritz Ursell (1923–2012), British mathematician
 Geoffrey Ursell (1943–2021), Canadian writer
 Harold Douglas Ursell (1907–1969), English mathematician

See also
 Pursell
 Ursell function
 Ursell number